The Return of the Condor Heroes is a Taiwanese television series adapted from Louis Cha's novel of the same name. It was first broadcast on CTV in 1984 in Taiwan.

Cast
 Meng Fei as Yang Guo (yeung kwok)
 Kuo Hui-wen as young Yang Guo
 Angela Pan as Xiaolongnü (siu loong nooi)
 Hsiang Yun-peng / Chang Han-po as Guo Jing(kwok ching)
 Shen Hai-jung as Huang Rong(wong yung)
 Lin Ling as Guo Fu
 Ying Hsiao-wei as Guo Xiang
 Chao Tien-li as Li Mochou
 Chiang Ta-chuan / Wang Hsieh as Huang Yaoshi
 Sun Jung-chi / Lü Fu-pao as Hong Qigong
 Li Chih-chien as Ouyang Feng
 Chu Pen-ke as Yideng
 Lung Kuan-wu as Zhou Botong
 Wang Chi-sheng as Jinlun Fawang
 Sung Hsien-hung as Huodu
 Kang Kai as Da'erba
 Lin Hsiu-chun as Cheng Ying
 Pei Hsin-yu as Lu Wushuang
 Fu Chuan / Tang Hui-chen as Gongsun Lü'e
 Chou Lin / Li An-shun as Yelü Qi
 Chao Hsueh-huang as Yin Zhiping
 Tang Fu-hsiung as Zhao Zhijing
 Lin Kuang-chin as Li Zhichang
 Kao Sheng as Lu Qingdu
 Chang Chieh / Kuan Hong as Gongsun Zhi
 Chen Chih-chen as Qiu Qianchi
 Chen Chih-tseng as Granny Sun
 Cheng Ching as Qiu Qianren (Ci'en)
 Mao Ching-shun as Qiu Chuji
 Wang Hai-lan as Sun Bu'er
 Li Kui as Wang Chuyi
 Xie Chien-wen as Hao Datong
 Niu Yen-jung as Yelü Yan
 Wang Yu-huan as Wanyan Ping
 Cheng Ya-yun as Hong Lingbo
 He Wei-hsiung / Hsueh Chang-wen as Wu Santong
 Lin Chi-yang as Wu Xiuwen
 Sun Hsiao-wei / Meng Chia-te as Wu Dunru
 Lin Feng-chin as Shagu
 Wang Chang-chih as Yelü Chucai
 Wei I-ping as Ke Zhen'e
 Chang Chia-hui as Yinggu
 Fu Ming as Lu Youjiao
 Hsieh Wen-to as Indian Monk
 Wang Fu-shih as Lu Liding
 Yeh Yun-yen as Xiaoxiangzi
 Chu Chien-tu as Guo Polu
 Hsieh Ping-nan / Chang Tai-lun as Kublai Khan
 Feng Kai as Renchuzi

External links

Taiwanese romance television series
1984 Taiwanese television series debuts
1984 Taiwanese television series endings
Taiwanese wuxia television series
Television shows based on The Return of the Condor Heroes
Television series set in the Southern Song
Television series set in the Mongol Empire
Television series about orphans
1980s Taiwanese television series
1980s romance television series